Sir Thomas William Boord, 1st Baronet FSA JP VD (14 July 1838 – 2 May 1912) was a British Conservative Party politician.

Boord was the son of Joseph Boord and his wife Mary Ann (née Newstead). He was elected as Member of Parliament (MP) for Greenwich a by-election in August 1873, and held the seat until he stood down at the 1895 general election. Apart from his political career he was a Captain the 1st Volunteer Battalion of the King's Royal Rifle Corps, a justice of the peace and a fellow of the Society of Antiquaries. On 18 February 1896 he was created a baronet, of Wakehurst Place in the County of Sussex.

Boord married Margaret, daughter of Thomas George Mackinlay, in 1861. They had three sons and two daughters.

He died on 2 May 1912, aged 73, and was buried in a family grave on the west side of Highgate Cemetery.

He was succeeded in the baronetcy by his eldest son William.

Lady Boord died on 22 December 1918.

Notes

References

External links 
 

Burials at Highgate Cemetery

1838 births
1912 deaths
Burials at Highgate Cemetery
King's Royal Rifle Corps officers
Conservative Party (UK) MPs for English constituencies
Boord, Sir Thomas, 1st Baronet
UK MPs 1868–1874
UK MPs 1874–1880
UK MPs 1880–1885
UK MPs 1885–1886
UK MPs 1886–1892
UK MPs 1892–1895
Fellows of the Society of Antiquaries of London